The alpha process, also known as the alpha ladder, is one of two classes of nuclear fusion reactions by which stars convert helium into heavier elements. The other class is a cycle of reactions called the triple-alpha process, which consumes only helium, and produces carbon.

Both processes are preceded by hydrogen fusion, which produces the helium that fuels both the triple-alpha process and the alpha ladder processes. After the triple alpha process has produced enough carbon, the alpha-ladder begins and fusion reactions of increasingly heavy elements take place, in the order listed below. Each step only consumes the product of the previous reaction and helium. The later-stage reactions which are able to begin in any particular star, do so while the prior stage reactions are still under way in outer layers of the star.

The energy produced by each reaction,   , is mainly in the form of gamma rays, with a small amount taken by the byproduct element, as added momentum.

(Nickel-62) is actually the most tightly bound nuclide in terms of binding energy (though Fe has a lower energy or mass per nucleon). The reaction  is actually exothermic, but nonetheless the sequence does effectively end at iron. The sequence stops before producing  because conditions in stellar interiors cause the competition between photodisintegration and the alpha process to favor photodisintegration around iron. This leads to more  being produced than 

All these reactions have a very low rate at the temperatures and densities in stars and therefore do not contribute significant energy to a star's total output. They occur even less easily with elements heavier than neon  due to the increasing Coulomb barrier.

Alpha process elements 
Alpha process elements (or alpha elements) are so-called since their most abundant isotopes are integer multiples of four – the mass of the helium nucleus (the alpha particle). These isotopes are called alpha nuclides.

 The stable alpha elements are: C, O, Ne, Mg, Si, and S.
 The elements Ar and Ca are "observationally stable". They are synthesized by alpha capture prior to the silicon fusing stage, that leads to 
 Si and Ca are purely alpha process elements.
 Mg can be separately consumed by proton capture reactions.

The status of oxygen (O) is contested – some authors consider it an alpha element, while others do not. O is surely an alpha element in low-metallicity Population II stars: It is produced in Type II supernovas, and its enhancement is well correlated with an enhancement of other alpha process elements.

Sometimes C and N are considered alpha process elements since, like O, they are synthesized in nuclear alpha-capture reactions, but their status is ambiguous: Each of the three elements is produced (and consumed) by the CNO cycle, which can proceed at temperatures far lower than those where the alpha-ladder processes start producing significant amounts of alpha elements (including C, N, & O). So just the presence of C, N, or O in a star does not a clearly indicate that the alpha process is actually underway – hence reluctance of some astronomers to (unconditionally) call these three "alpha elements".

Special notation for relative abundance 
The abundance of total alpha elements in stars is usually expressed in terms of logarithms, with astronomers customarily using a square bracket notation:
 
It is for the purpose of calculating the number  that which elements are to be considered "alpha elements" becomes contentious.

Theoretical galactic evolution models predict that early in the universe there were more alpha elements relative to iron. Type II supernovae mainly synthesize oxygen and the alpha-elements (Ne, Mg, Si, S, Ar, Ca, and Ti) while Type Ia supernovae mainly produce elements of the iron peak (Ti, V, Cr, Mn, Fe, Co, and Ni), but also alpha-elements.

References

Further reading 
 

Nuclear fusion
Nucleosynthesis